Dimzukalns is a village in Bauska Municipality in the historical region of Semigallia, and the Zemgale Planning Region in Latvia.

References

Bauska Municipality
Towns and villages in Latvia
Semigallia